Darryl Bootland (born November 2, 1981) is a Canadian former professional ice hockey right wing who played in the National Hockey League (NHL) with the Detroit Red Wings and New York Islanders.

Playing career
Bootland was drafted 252nd overall in the 2000 NHL Entry Draft by the Colorado Avalanche from the Toronto St. Michael's Majors of the Ontario Hockey League. After his final year in the OHL, Bootland signed with the Detroit Red Wings as a free agent to a three-year contract on August 29, 2002.

Bootland made his NHL debut with the Red Wings in the 2003–04 season, recording two points (1–1–2) and 74 PIM in 22 games. Bootland spent the next three years with the Red Wings affiliate, the Grand Rapids Griffins of the AHL before getting recalled by the Red Wings on March 5, 2007, playing in six games.

On July 6, 2007, Bootland signed with the New York Islanders. He appeared in four games with the Islanders before he was traded to the Anaheim Ducks in exchange for Matt Keith on January 9, 2008.

On October 7, 2008, Bootland signed a 25 Game Professional Tryout Agreement with the Manitoba Moose of the AHL. On December 15, 2008, Bootland signed with Salzburg EC in Austria.

On September 2, 2009, Bootland signed with the Kalamazoo Wings of the ECHL. Darryl was signed to the K-Wings by his brother Nick, who was (and remains to this day) the K-Wings' director of hockey operations and head coach. While starting the 2009–10 season with the K-Wings, Bootland then signed for a second try-out stint with the Moose. Upon his return to Kalamazoo Bootland left again for Austria, signing with the Vienna Capitals on February 1, 2010.

The following season, Darryl continued his journeyman career, by returning to the Islanders minor-league affiliates in accepting a try-out to the Bridgeport Sound Tigers training camp. On October 1, 2010, he was assigned and signed with the Islanders CHL affiliate, the Odessa Jackalopes for the 2010–11 season.

After returning to the Kalamazoo Wings for the 2011–12 season, Bootland produced his best numbers since 2006, scoring 53 points in 67 contests. A free agent, Bootland opted for a second stint in the CHL, signing a one-year contract with the Allen Americans on July 25, 2012.

After two consecutive Ray Miron Cup championship winning seasons with the Americans, Bootland returned to the ECHL as a free agent to sign a one-year contract with the Colorado Eagles on August 12, 2014.

Bootland added a veteran presence and set the physical tone with the Eagles for three seasons, culminating in capturing their first Kelly Cup in the 2016–17 season.

As a free agent with ambition to prolong his career, Bootland secured a one-year deal with the Orlando Solar Bears of the ECHL on September 21, 2017. In the 2017–18 season, Bootland was hampered through injury and lack of playing time and after just 21 games with Orlando he was released from his contract on March 13, 2018.

Personal
Darryl married Sarah Mauldin on June 23, 2010. They raise three kids together, Trace Riley Gunter January 20, 2006 from a previous relationship, Havyn Bennett Bootland, March 3, 2013 and Loxley Belle Bootland, January 17, 2017.

Career statistics

Awards and honours

References

External links

1981 births
Allen Americans players
Barrie Colts players
Bridgeport Sound Tigers players
Canadian ice hockey right wingers
Colorado Avalanche draft picks
Colorado Eagles players
Detroit Red Wings players
EC Red Bull Salzburg players
Grand Rapids Griffins players
Ice hockey people from Ontario
Kalamazoo Wings (ECHL) players
Living people
Manitoba Moose players
New York Islanders players
Odessa Jackalopes players
Orlando Solar Bears (ECHL) players
Portland Pirates players
Toledo Storm players
Toronto St. Michael's Majors players
Vienna Capitals players
Sportspeople from King, Ontario
Canadian expatriate ice hockey players in Austria